Dear Diary is a Christian rock opera, and the third studio album by the pop punk band FM Static. It was released on April 7, 2009, through Tooth & Nail Records.

According to Trevor McNevan "It's a concept record, the entire album will be one story from beginning to end. It's based on a boy (and occasionally a girl) and their diary entries about what's going on in their lives. It deals with faith, doubt, love, death, and the honest questions that surround living and growing up in modern day culture. We're very pumped about this record and are excited to share it with you." The cover art was drawn by Worth Dying For guitarist Nathan Parrish.

Track listing

Prior to the album's release, the songs "Boy Moves to a New Town With Optimistic Outlook", "The Unavoidable Battle of Feeling on the Outside", and "Take Me As I Am" were released on the band's MySpace page.

Personnel
 Trevor McNevan - vocals, guitars
 Steve Augustine - drums
 Randy Torres - guitars, bass
 Adam Smith - piano

Charts

References

2009 albums
FM Static albums
Tooth & Nail Records albums
Albums produced by Aaron Sprinkle
Concept albums
Rock operas